Gaibandha-1 is a constituency represented in the Jatiya Sangsad (National Parliament) of Bangladesh since 2018 by Shamim Haider Patwary of the Jatiya Party (Ershad).

Boundaries 
The constituency encompasses Sundarganj Upazila.

History 
The constituency was created in 1984 from a Rangpur constituency when the former Rangpur District was split into five districts: Nilphamari, Lalmonirhat, Rangpur, Kurigram, and Gaibandha.

Members of Parliament

Elections

Elections in the 2010s 
Golam Mostafa Ahmed died in December 2017. Shamim Haider Patwary of the Jatiya Party (Ershad) was elected in a March 2018 by-election.

Manjurul Islam Liton was murdered in December 2016. Golam Mostafa Ahmed of the Awami League was elected in a March 2017 by-election. He defeated Jatiya Party (Ershad) candidate Shamim Haider Patwary, Jatiya Party (Monju) candidate Waheduzzaman, and four other contenders.

Elections in the 2000s

Elections in the 1990s

References

External links
 

Parliamentary constituencies in Bangladesh
Gaibandha District
1984 establishments in Bangladesh